Pegrema is an abandoned village in Medvezhyegorsky District of the Republic of Karelia, Russia, situated on a bank of Lake Onega, about 10 km from Unitsa.

Pegrema is a beautiful example of the region's wooden architecture. It consists of several large peasant houses, the fronts of which are faced to the lake.

In the 1770s, the Varlaam Khutynsky chapel was built on a little cape in front of the houses. The chapel remains almost completely intact, although all icons were removed from it after the Russian Revolution.

Defunct towns in Russia
Geography of the Republic of Karelia
Former populated places in Russia